The Kuayue Kuayuexing is a series microvan produced by Chongqing Kuayue Automobile Co.,Ltd of Changan Automobile under the Kuayue sub-brand.

Overview
The Kuayuexing vans were launched in September 2021. The model line is available in 3 different sizes, starting with the Kuayuexing V3 as the base model, the Kuayuexing V5 and V5 NEV as the midsize variant, and the Kuayuexing V7 and V7 EV as the largest variant.   

The Kuayuexing V3 and V5 is powered by a 107hp (78.5kW) 1.5 liter naturally aspirated engine with 140 to 141Nm of torque mated to a 5-speed manual transmission.  The Kuayuexing V7 is powered by a 122hp (90kW) 1.6 liter naturally aspirated engine with 158Nm of torque mated to a 5-speed manual transmission.

Electric variant
The electric versions are also available for the Kuayuexing V5 and Kuayuexing V7. The Kuayuexing V5 NEV is available as a 6 or 7 seater powered by a 60kW and 220N·m electric motor powering the rear wheels with a 41.86kWh battery supporting a range of 300km. The Kuayuexing V7EV is available as a 6 or 7 seater powered by a 60kW and 220N·m electric motor powering the rear wheels with a 41.86kWh battery supporting a range of 300km.

References

Kuayue Kuayuexing
Vans
Microvans
Rear-wheel-drive vehicles
Cars of China
Cars introduced in 2021
Production electric cars